Comitas ilariae is a species of sea snail, a marine gastropod mollusk in the family Pseudomelatomidae, the turrids and allies.

Description
The length of the shell varies between 70 mm and 85 mm.

Distribution
This marine species occurs off the Philippines.

References

 Bozzetti, L. (1991) Comitas ilariae new species from the Philippines. La Conchiglia, 22(258), 26–28

External links
 Holotype at MNHN, Paris
 
 

ilariae
Gastropods described in 1991